Voyage.tv is an online travel channel that produces and distributes travel video programming on the Internet, cable television, and Video on Demand. Functioning as a tool for exploring destinations, sharing travel experiences, and booking trips, Voyage.tv is a global platform for travelers to exchange advice and access an inside look at destinations around the world. It was founded in 2006 and is headquartered in New York City.

Program categories
Destination Videos fall within several branded program categories:

72-Hours highlights top attractions or things to do within a destination
Conversations With features interviews with notable people within destinations
Earth Calling includes eco-centric and "green" programming
Goodlife highlights luxury and upscale lifestyle experiences in each destination
Gourmet Regionale showcases restaurants and dining around the world
Guy Stuff focuses on activities and content for a male demographic
Kidz highlights attractions and activities geared towards children and families
Look centers on fashion, style and shopping programming
Nirvana features spas and treatments around the world

Articles and editorial content
Video segments are accompanied by an array of articles written by resident editors within each destination and journalists that include travel writing on dining, nightlife, spas, area excursions, attractions, sightseeing, tours, shopping and other lifestyle interests.

Distribution
Voyage.tv also has a branded YouTube channel (VoyageChannel), which broadcasts select videos from Voyage's slate and provides an alternate portal for viewers to access the content.

References

External links
Voyage.TV in history

Television networks in the United States